West Burke is a village in the town of Burke, Caledonia County, Vermont, United States. The population was 281 at the 2020 census.

Geography
Vermont Route 5A intersects US 5 in the center of the village, leading north to Lake Willoughby. The Sutton River flows into the West Branch of the Passumpsic River in the center of the village.

Demographics

As of the census of 2000, there were 364 people, 140 households, and 96 families residing in the village.  The population density was 828.4 people per square mile (319.4/km2).  There were 147 housing units at an average density of 334.5/sq mi (129.0/km2).  The racial makeup of the village was 98.63% White, 1.10% Native American, 0.27% from other races. Hispanic or Latino of any race were 1.37% of the population.

There were 140 households, out of which 34.3% had children under the age of 18 living with them, 50.7% were married couples living together, 13.6% had a female householder with no husband present, and 31.4% were non-families. 23.6% of all households were made up of individuals, and 7.1% had someone living alone who was 65 years of age or older.  The average household size was 2.60 and the average family size was 3.08.

In the village, the population was spread out, with 26.6% under the age of 18, 11.5% from 18 to 24, 26.9% from 25 to 44, 23.9% from 45 to 64, and 11.0% who were 65 years of age or older.  The median age was 34 years. For every 100 females, there were 110.4 males.  For every 100 females age 18 and over, there were 100.8 males.

The median income for a household in the village was $25,000, and the median income for a family was $31,250. Males had a median income of $34,167 versus $26,875 for females. The per capita income for the village was $16,764.  About 24.5% of families and 27.8% of the population were below the poverty line, including 32.2% of those under age 18 and 25.0% of those age 65 or over.

References

External links
Town of Burke official website

Incorporated villages in Vermont
 West Burke
Villages in Caledonia County, Vermont